Galesburg Township is one of twenty-one townships in Knox County, Illinois, USA.  As of the 2010 census, its population was 366 and it contained 181 housing units.

Geography

Cemeteries
The township contains these two cemeteries: Clay and Saint Josephs.

Demographics

School districts
 Galesburg Community Unit School District 205

Political districts
 Illinois's 17th congressional district
 State House District 74
 State Senate District 37

References
 
 United States Census Bureau 2009 TIGER/Line Shapefiles
 United States National Atlas

External links
 City-Data.com
 Illinois State Archives
 Township Officials of Illinois

Townships in Knox County, Illinois
Galesburg, Illinois micropolitan area
Townships in Illinois